Alexander Dick (18271 June 1867) was an Australian politician.

He was the son of Scottish immigrant Alexander Dick, a silversmith, and Charlotte Hutchison. He was admitted as a solicitor in 1850 and practised in Sydney. In 1860 he was elected to the New South Wales Legislative Assembly for Liverpool Plains, but he resigned in 1862 to accept an appointment as 2nd Examiner of Titles.

References

 

1827 births
1867 deaths
Members of the New South Wales Legislative Assembly
19th-century Australian politicians